Anandpur Sahib, sometimes referred to simply as Anandpur (lit. "city of bliss"), is a city in Rupnagar district (Ropar), on the edge of Shivalik Hills, in the Indian state of Punjab. Located near the Sutlej River, the city is one of the most sacred places in Sikhism, being the place where the last two Sikh Gurus, Guru Tegh Bahadur and Guru Gobind Singh, lived. It is also the place where Guru Gobind Singh founded the Khalsa Panth in 1699. The city is home to Takhat Sri Kesgarh Sahib,  Third of the five Takhts in Sikhism.

The city is a pilgrimage site in Sikhism. It is the venue of the largest annual Sikh gathering and festivities during Hola Mohalla in the spring season.

Location
Anandpur Sahib is located on National Highway 503 that links Kiratpur Sahib and Chandigarh to Nangal, Una and further Kangra, Himachal Pradesh. It is situated near the Sutlej river, the longest of the five rivers that flow through the historic crossroads region of Punjab.

History

Anandpur Sahib was founded in June 1665 by the ninth Sikh Guru, Guru Tegh Bahadur. He previously lived in Kiratpur, but given the disputes with Ram Rai – the elder son of Guru Har Rai and other sects of Sikhism, he moved to village in Makhoval. He named it Chakk Nanaki after his mother. In 1675, Guru Tegh Bahadur was tortured and beheaded for refusing to convert to Islam under the orders of the Mughal Emperor Aurangzeb, a martyrdom that led Sikhs to rename the town to Anandpur and crown his son Gobind Das as per his orders (also known as Gobind Rai) as his successor and famous as Guru Gobind Singh.

The village grew into town, likely dramatically state Louis E. Fenech and W. H. McLeod, as Sikhs moved near Guru Gobind Singh. The growing strength of Sikhs in Anandpur under the tenth Guru, after the execution of the ninth Guru, raised concerns of the neighboring Pahari rajas - the vassals of the Mughal Empire, along with the Mughal ruler Aurangzeb. In 1693, Aurangzeb issued an order that banned large gatherings of Sikhs such as during the festival of Baisakhi. In 1699, Guru Gobind Singh founded the Khalsa panth and gathered a large armed militia. This triggered Aurangzeb and his vassal Hindu kings around Anandpur to blockade Anandpur. This led to several battles:

 First Battle of Anandpur (1700), against the Mughal army of Aurangzeb, who had sent 10,000 soldiers under the command of Painda Khan and Dina Beg. In a direct combat between Guru Gobind Singh and Painda Khan, the latter was killed. His death led to the Mughal army fleeing the battlefield.
 Second Battle of Anandpur (1704), against the Mughal army led first by Saiyad Khan and then by Ramjan Khan; The Mughal general was fatally wounded by Sikh soldiers, and the army withdrew. Aurangzeb then sent a larger army with two generals, Wazir Khan and Zaberdast Khan in May 1704, to destroy the Sikh resistance. The approach the Mughal army took in this battle was to lay a protracted siege against Anandpur, from May to December, cutting off all food and other supplies moving in and out, along with repeated battles. Some Sikh men deserted the Guru during Anandpur siege in 1704, and escaped to their homes where their women shamed them and they rejoined the Guru's army and died fighting with him in 1705. Towards the end, the Guru, his family and followers accepted an offer by Aurangzeb of safe passage out of Anandpur. However, as they left Anandpur in two batches, they were attacked, and one of the batches with Mata Gujari and Guru's two sons – Zorawar Singh aged 8 and Fateh Singh aged 5 – were taken captive by the Mughal army. Both his children were executed by burying them alive into a wall. The grandmother Mata Gujari died there as well.

According to Louis Fenech, Anandpur's history during the late 17th century and early 18th century was complex and war prone because the relationship of Guru Gobind Singh with his neighbors was complex. Sometimes the hill chiefs and Guru Gobind Singh cooperated in a battle, sometimes they fought against each other, where the difficult mountainous terrain made it difficult for the Mughal to subdue everyone with force and the terrain made it easier for Pahari chieftains to rebel against the Mughals routinely.

Virasat-e-Khalsa Museum campus links, particularly with the need of the population, providing business to the locals and makes the city marked on urban literature globally. Punjab Heritage Tourism Promotion Board paid to have it installed in order to attract worldwide tourism. Open spaces which are going to be used by ritual activities during ceremonies and festivals also serve as alternative parking grounds, reserved grounds for political rallies which brings the intact ingredient of Indian cities together “The Interaction”.

Landmarks 

Elements convening definitions of the city Anandpur Sahib are:
Heterogeneous societies and discrete buildings as economic and administrative, social, institutional, political, neighborhoods and associated personnel, compacted and overlapped packing of residential and nonresidential structures, monumental core of unique buildings (for example, Keshgarh Sahib Gurudwara, bus stand structure), Five Forts of city and Khalsa Heritage Museum, special characteristic features “City profile” of Anandpur Sahib that shows maximum building height at the centre of the city and less height as one moves away from the city centre, central focus the enshrined centre, whose access was restricted and where Gurudwaras predominated.

Gurdwaras

Anandpur Sahib is in Punjab state of India, close to the Himachal Pradesh border. Anandpur has been significant to the Sikh history. These historical locations now feature the following Gurdwaras:
Gurudwara Takht Sri Kesgarh Sahib: is the principal Sikh temple in the town. It marks the birthplace of Khalsa and one of the five religious authorities (Five Takhts) of Sikhism. Standing on a hillock, the present complex was built between 1936 and 1944. The plan of the building is a square set inside a  square courtyard. In it are the Takht's office and a Gurdwara. The Gurdwara has a  square hall, inside which is  square sanctum with the Sikh scripture and old weapons used by Guru Gobind Singh's Khalsa, signifying the miri and piri aspects of the Sikh faith. The dome of the Gurdwara is fluted lotus. The lower levels of the complex has a langar (free community kitchen run by volunteers), a  square divan hall, and a row of rooms for pilgrims called the Dashmesh Nivas. Nearby is an  square sarovar (holy water tank) for pilgrims to take their pilgrimage dip.
Gurdwara Sisganj: built by Ranjit Singh to mark the place where Guru Tegh Bahadur's severed head after his execution in Delhi, was cremated in 1675. Guru Gobind Singh had a platform and shrine built on the site of the cremation. He entrusted an Udasi Sikh named Gurbakhsh to protect this shrine when he left Anandpur in 1705. The Gurdwara was enlarged and renovated in the 1970s. This Sikh temple features a pinnacled dome under which is the sanctum.
Gurudwara Bhora Sahib: A three-storey domed Gurdwara which was the residence of Guru Teg Bahadur. It now houses the Guru Granth Sahib.
Gurudwara Thara Sahib: A  platform in the front of Damdama Sahib where Bhai Kripa Ram Dutt along with other 16 Kashmiri Pandits sought his help in 1675. They came to seek protection from Aurangzeb and requested Guru Teg Bahadur to save them from forcible conversions to Islam.
Gurudwara Akal Bunga Sahib: This Gurdwara is opposite to Gurdwara Sis Ganj Sahib. It was built by a pujari named Man Singh in 1889. Here Guru Gobind Singh after the cremation of the "head of Guru Teg Bahadur" had delivered a sermon after the beheading of his father Guru Teg Bahadur in Delhi.
Gurudwara Damdama Sahib: Close to Gurdwara Sisganj Sahib, it shares the compound with Anandpur Bhora Sahib and Thara Sahib, which is also called Guru ke Mahal. This Gurdwara remembers the residential quarters of Guru Tegh Bahadur. He used to welcome and counsel Sikh sangats who would visit him. Guru Gobind Singh was designated as the tenth guru at this place. The octagonal domed building here was built in 20th century.
Gurudwara Manji Sahib / Gurudwara Dumalgarh Sahib: This Gurdwara is on the northern side of Takht Shri Keshgarh Sahib. Here, Guru Gobind Singh used to train his sons. This place was used as playground; wrestling and other competitions were held here.
Gurdwara Shaeedhi Bagh: This Gurdwara is located on the road between Takhat Shri Kesh Garh Sahib & Kila Anand Garh Sahib. In early days of eighteenth century this place was a big garden during skirmishes between Sikh Army and Bilaspur Army, many Sikh soldiers laid their lives here in this garden, hence this place is termed as Gurdwara Shaeedhi Bagh.
Gurdwara Mata Jit Kaur: Mata Jit Kaur, wife of Guru Gobind Singh had a vision "Divya-drishti" of the atrocities and cruelties on Sikhs and young sons. She was cremated near Quilla Holgarh Sahib. This place is now termed Gurdwara Mata Jit Kaur.
Gurdwara Guru Ka Mahal: It was the first building of Chak Nanaki, Anandpur Sahib. The foundation stone was laid here. Guru Gobind Singh, Mata Gujri, Mata Jit Kaur, Mata Sundar Kaur, Mata Sahib Kaur and four sons of the Guru had been living here: Jujhar Singh, Zorawar Singh and Fateh Singh were born here. Gurdwara Bhora Sahib, Gurdwara Manji Sahib and Gurdwara Damdama Sahib are part of Gurdwara Guru Ka Mahal Complex.

Forts
10th Sikh Guru Guru Gobind Singh made five forts on the border of the city. The buildings to commemorate each of these were built between late 1970s and the late 1980s:
Qila Anandgarh Sahib: This was the main fort, after which the city was also named Anandpur Sahib. The Army once resided here.
Qila Holgarh Sahib: Here Holla Mohalla was celebrated.
Qila Lohgarh Sahib: Here the weapons for the Army were made.
Qila Fatehgarh Sahib: Fateh Singh was born here hence the name.

Qila Taragarh Sahib: This fort was made to stop the hill armies.

Sacred sites near Anandpur Sahib
Guru-Ka-Lahore: It is situated about 11 km on Sri Anandpur Sahib-Ganguwal route leading to the state of Himachal Pradesh, India. On 25 January 1686, the 10th Guru's wedding to Mata was celebrated here. Two trickling springs, claimed to be dug out from the stony mountain-side by the 10th Guru, still exist today.
Bhai Kanhaiya : Bhai Kanhaiya offered first aid to friendly and enemy forces alike across the area spanning the now-almost dried up rivulet Charan Ganga and below the Taragarh hill. His unbiased service has been compared to the functions of the Red Cross.
Shri Naina Devi ji : This temple is one of the oldest and holiest  temple in Distt-Bilaspur, Himachal Pradesh.So many tourists visit here after going to Anandpur Sahib.It's about 20km away from Anandpur Sahib and situated on Shivalik Range.

Demographics

 India census, The Anandpur Sahib Municipal Council has population of 16,282 of which 8,545 are males while 7,737 are females as per report released by Census India 2011.

Population of children with age of 0-6 is 1774 which is 10.90% of total population of Anandpur Sahib (M Cl). In Anandpur Sahib Municipal Council, Female Sex Ratio is of 905 against state average of 895. Moreover, Child Sex Ratio in Anandpur Sahib is around 932 compared to Punjab state average of 846. Literacy rate of Anandpur Sahib city is 82.44% higher than state average of 75.84%. In Anandpur Sahib, Male literacy is around 85.75% while female literacy rate is 78.78%.

Anandpur Sahib Municipal Council has total administration over 3,270 houses to which it supplies basic amenities like water and sewerage. It is also authorized to build roads within Municipal Council limits and impose taxes on properties coming under its jurisdiction.

Festivals and fairs 

Anandpur Sahib features a major festival and gathering of Sikhs every year on the occasion of Hola Mohalla. This tradition dates back to the times of the 10th Guru, Guru Gobind Singh. The guru decreed that the occasion of the festival of Holi be the occasion for the display of the martial spirit of his people. He gave this festival of Holi the Sikh name of 'Hola Mohalla'. Each year Hola Mohalla marks the congregation of nearly 20,00,000 Sikhs from all over the country for a festival of colour and gaiety. The festival, among other things, remembers the creation of Khalsa on the Baisakhi day in 1699.

The fair lasts for three days. The Gurudwaras are specially decorated for the occasion. During Hola Mohalla, Anandpur Sahib wears a festive appearance and hums with activities in March. Community conferences and religious functions are also organized. On this occasion, Nihangs from all over the country gather for the celebrations. The highlight is a huge procession by the Nihangs, clad in their traditional dress and weapons, on the last day of the fair. The procession starts from the headquarters of the Nihangs, opposite Gurudwara Anandgarh Sahib, and passes through the bazaar, goes to village Agampur and reaches the fort of Holgarh, the place where Guru Gobind Singh used to celebrate this fair. Thereafter, the procession heads toward the sandy bed of Charan Ganga, where demonstration of martial games including riding, tent pegging, sword-wielding, etc. are witnessed by a large number of people.

Baisakhi in 1999, at Anandpur Sahib marked the completion of 300 years of the birth of the Khalsa. It was on Baisakhi day in 1699 that Guru Gobind Singh baptised the Panj Pyaras at the place where Takht Sri Keshgarh Sahib stands.

Other places

Khalsa Heritage Memorial Complex
Sri Dasmesh Academy
Naina Devi 
The world's tallest khanda is installed at Sri Anandpur Sahib at Panj Piara Park with an estimated height of 70 feet.

See also
Sikhism
Nankana Sahib
Amritsar

References

Bibliography 
 Dilgeer, Dr Harjinder Singh (1998), Anandpur Sahib (Punjabi and Hindi), S.G.P.C.
 Dilgeer, Dr Harjinder Singh (2003), Anandpur Sahib (English and Punjabi), Sikh University Press.
 Dilgeer, Dr Harjinder Singh (2008), SIKH TWAREEKH (5 volumes), Sikh University Press.

External links

Anandpur Sahib
1999 Baisakhi

Cities and towns in Rupnagar district
Sikh places
Populated places established in 1665
1665 establishments in India